Laszki  (Liashky) is a village in Jarosław County, Subcarpathian Voivodeship, in south-eastern Poland. It is the seat of the gmina (administrative district) called Gmina Laszki.

The village has a population of 1,827.

References

Laszki